Discula tabellata is a species of small air-breathing land snail, a terrestrial pulmonate gastropod mollusk in the family Geomitridae.

Distribution
This species occurs in Madeira, Portugal.

Shell description
The shell of these snails is shaped like a discus, or a lens, with a sharp edge around the periphery of the whorls.

Conservation status
This species is endangered, as mentioned in annexes II and IV of Habitats Directive.

References

Discula
Taxa named by Richard Thomas Lowe
Gastropods described in 1852